The MV Krait  is a wooden-hulled vessel famous for its use during World War II by the Z Special Unit (Z Force) of Australia during the raid against Japanese ships anchored in Singapore Harbour. The raid was known as Operation Jaywick.

The MV Krait is on display at the Australian National Maritime Museum (ANMM) in Sydney.

History
Krait was originally a Japanese fishing vessel based in Singapore named Kofuku Maru. Following the outbreak of war, the ship was taken over by the American destroyer USS Edsall and used to evacuate over 1,100 people from ships sunk along the east coast of Sumatra. The ship eventually reached Australia via Ceylon and India in 1942, and was handed over to the Australian military. In Australian service, she was renamed Krait after the small but deadly snake.

In September 1943, Krait transported members of Z Special Unit to Singapore, where they successfully raided the city's harbour, sinking seven ships, in what became known as Operation Jaywick. She returned to Australia in October. Krait was used by the Australian military throughout the war, and was present at the surrender of the Japanese forces on Ambon in September 1945.

Krait was later used as transport for intelligence-gathering missions to islands in the area, including Buru, Aru, Ceram, Banda, and Saparua. During this period, she carried several Japanese prisoners, army survey teams, and a naval intelligence officer.

At Ambon, the boat acquired a monkey as a mascot. He was named Peter and had lost his tail. Peter remained with the crew until Krait finished her service and was towed to Morotai. She was then sailed to Labuan, where she was sold and handed over to the British Borneo Company and where Able Seaman Robert Harry Easom of Perth kept its ensign as a souvenir. That ensign is now on display at the Australian War Memorial in Canberra.

After its sale, Krait was operated off Borneo until she was purchased for use as an Australian Royal Volunteer Coastal Patrol vessel in 1964. On Anzac Day 1964, Krait was formally dedicated as a war memorial by the governor of NSW. A plaque was affixed to the wheelhouse and is shown below. She was then acquired by the Australian War Memorial in 1985 and was lent to the Australian National Maritime Museum, where she has been displayed to the public since 1988.

From 2015, plans for restoration had been made, and as of 2017, this work has begun.

Since the success of Krait at Singapore, Australian Commando Unit vessels have traditionally used the names of venomous snakes. This tradition continues with Red Viper and Coral Snake as current examples.

Affiliations
TS Krait, Australian Navy Cadets

See also
 Australian commandos

References

Australian Department of Veteran's Affairs OP Jaywick website, background and photos
Includes map of route taken and detail of raid
Australian War Memorial
Post war service with Volunteer Coastal Patrol
HNSA Web Page: Commando Boat Krait

External links 
 
 Krait – vessel page at the Australian National Maritime Museum

Military history of Australia during World War II
Museum ships in Australia
Special forces of Australia
Ships of Australia
Australian National Maritime Museum
Naval trawlers
Captured ships
World War II raids